Alexander Ferdinand Koenig (20 February 1858 – 16 July 1940) was a German naturalist and zoologist.

Koenig was born at St Petersburg, Russia where his father was a successful merchant.  He grew up in Bonn. Koenig became interested in natural history at an early age and started to collect specimens.

He studied zoology at the universities of Greifswald, Kiel, Berlin and Marburg, where he received his doctorate in with a thesis on Mallophaga, "Ein Beitrag zur Mallophagenfauna". He funded expeditions to the Spitzbergen region of the Arctic and to Africa, where he visited Egypt and Sudan — on six separate occasions he traveled to the Nile.

With his collections he founded the Museum Koenig in Bonn in 1912.  The museum collection includes specimens Koenig collected from even early in his life.

He died in Mecklenburg.

Selected works 
 Avifauna Spitzbergensis : Forschungsreisen nach der Bären-Insel und dem Spitzbergen-Archipel, mit ihren faunistischen und floristischen Ergebnissen (with Otto Le Roi), 1911 – Birdlife of Spitzbergen: research trips to Bear Island and the Svalbard archipelago, with its faunal and floristic results.
 Katalog der nido-oologischen Sammlung (Vogeleiersammlung) im Museum Alexander Koenig (4 volumes, 1932) – Catalogue of nido-oological specimens (bird egg collection) in the Alexander Koenig Museum.
 Die Vögel am Nil : von seiner Mündung bis in das Gebiet seiner Quellflüsse (Weisser Nil) auf Grund eigener Reisen und Beobachtungen in Wort und Bild dargestellt (2 volumes 1936) – The birds of the Nile region.

References

External links
 Museum Koenig
  Koenig Museum information

German naturalists
19th-century German zoologists
German ornithologists
Scientists from Bonn
University of Greifswald alumni
University of Marburg alumni
University of Kiel alumni
Humboldt University of Berlin alumni
1858 births
1940 deaths
20th-century German zoologists